Petracola is a genus of lizards in the family Gymnophthalmidae. The genus is endemic to Peru.

Species
The genus Petracola contains five species which are recognized as being valid.
Petracola angustisoma 
Petracola labioocularis 
Petracola pajatensis 
Petracola ventrimaculatus  - spotted lightbulb lizard
Petracola waka 

Nota bene: A binomial authority in parentheses indicates that the species was originally described in a genus other than Petracola.

References

 
Lizard genera
Taxa named by Tiffany M. Doan
Taxa named by Todd Adam Castoe